Biseh (also Romanized as Bīseh; also known as Bīsheh, Nasyeh, and Pīseh) is a village in Fatuyeh Rural District, in the Central District of Bastak County, Hormozgan Province, Iran. At the 2006 census, its population was 204, in 40 families.

References 

Populated places in Bastak County